Avonport Station is a community in Kings County, Nova Scotia, Canada. It is located near Avonport. The Horton Bluff formation is located 2.5 kilometres southeast from the community.

References

Communities in Kings County, Nova Scotia